The women's 400 metres sprint competition of the athletics events at the 1979 Pan American Games took place at the Estadio Sixto Escobar. The defending Pan American Games champion was Joyce Yakubowich of Canada.

Records
Prior to this competition, the existing world and Pan American Games records were as follows:

Results
All times shown are in seconds.

Heats

Final
Held on 12 July

References

Athletics at the 1979 Pan American Games
1979